Stuart Ricardo Goss (born 2 April 1994) is a South African soccer player who plays as a goalkeeper for South African Premier Division club SuperSport United on loan from Mamelodi Sundowns and the South Africa national football team.

Goss started his senior career Lamontville Golden Arrows and had spells at Real Kings and Bidvest Wits before joining Mamelodi Sundowns in 2020.

Early and personal life
Goss was born in Durban and grew up in Chesterville. His mother Faith was a single mother and Ricardo has never met his father.

Club career

Lamontville Golden Arrows
He made his debut for Lamontville Golden Arrows on 1 May 2013 in a 4–1 defeat to Moroka Swallows. Despite the 4–1 defeat, manager Manqoba Mngqithi was complimentary of Goss' performance, saying "To be honest, I was quite impressed with Ricardo on the day but the circumstances were not favouring him."

In total, he made just 2 league appearances for Golden Arrows before leaving the club in 2017.

Real Kings
In July 2017, he joined Real Kings on a two-year deal. He played all 30 league games for Real Kings in the National First Division across the 2017–18 season, as they finished fourth.

Bidvest Wits
Goss joined South African Premier Division side Bidvest Wits in August 2018. He appeared five times in the South African Premier Division across the 2018–19 season.

He received an eight-match ban in March 2020 for assaulting the referee in a 2–0 defeat to Cape Town City on 18 January 2020.

In total, he made 19 league appearances for Bidvest Wits across the 2019–20 season.

Mamelodi Sundowns
In September 2020, he joined Mamelodi Sundowns on a five-year contract. In response to signing for Mamelodi Sundowns, Goss said "It has been a childhood dream for me to join the club."

International career
Goss has appeared for South Africa at under-23 level and for the senior national team.

References

Living people
1994 births
South African soccer players
Sportspeople from Durban
Association football goalkeepers
Lamontville Golden Arrows F.C. players
Real Kings F.C. players
Bidvest Wits F.C. players
Mamelodi Sundowns F.C. players
SuperSport United F.C. players
South African Premier Division players
National First Division players
South Africa international soccer players
South Africa youth international soccer players
2015 Africa U-23 Cup of Nations players